Nguyễn Huy Cường (born 8 November 1986) is a Vietnamese footballer who plays as a centre-back for V-League club Than Quảng Ninh and the Vietnam national football team.

References 

1986 births
Living people
Vietnamese footballers
Association football central defenders
V.League 1 players
Vietnam international footballers
Than Quang Ninh FC players
People from Quảng Ninh province